Philippe Ermenault (born 29 April 1969) is a French former track cyclist. Ermenault was twice world champion in individual pursuit and Olympic champion as part of the France team in the team pursuit. He is the father of racing cyclist Corentin Ermenault.

Results

References

External links 

1969 births
Living people
Sportspeople from Somme (department)
Cyclists at the 1992 Summer Olympics
Cyclists at the 1996 Summer Olympics
Cyclists at the 2000 Summer Olympics
French male cyclists
Olympic cyclists of France
Olympic gold medalists for France
Olympic silver medalists for France
UCI Track Cycling World Champions (men)
Olympic medalists in cycling
Medalists at the 1996 Summer Olympics
French track cyclists
20th-century French people
21st-century French people
Cyclists from Hauts-de-France